The Edgemont Shelter, also designated by the Smithsonian trinomial 3VB6, is a prehistoric rock art site in Van Buren County, Arkansas.  Located on a bluff overlooking Greers Ferry Lake, it consists of a panel extensively painted with petroglyphs.  The site has been dated to about 1500.

The site was listed on the National Register of Historic Places in 1982.

See also
 Lynn Creek Shelter: NRHP-listed in Van Buren County
 National Register of Historic Places listings in Van Buren County, Arkansas

References

Archaeological sites on the National Register of Historic Places in Arkansas
National Register of Historic Places in Van Buren County, Arkansas
Petroglyphs in Arkansas
Rock shelters in the United States